Muž na radnici was a Czechoslovak television program which was broadcast in 1976. The program was directed by Evžen Sokolovský. In 2011, it was announced that the program, along with 17 others, would be released on DVD within three years.

References

External links 
 CSFD.cz - Muž na radnici
 

Czechoslovak television series
1976 Czechoslovak television series debuts
Czech drama television series
1970s Czechoslovak television series
Czech political television series
Czechoslovak Television original programming